Dr. Afraahseem Ali (died 2 October 2012) was a Member of the Maldives parliament for the Progressive Party of Maldives representing Raa Atoll Ungoofaru Constituency, in the 17th sitting of the Maldives Parliament.

Death

Dr Afrasheem was murdered near his residence on 2 October 2012. He was already pronounced dead when brought to ADK Hospital that day.

The investigation to the death of Dr Afrasheem was one of the largest scale operations carried out by the Maldives Police Service with regular press briefings. On 23 May 2013 Hussain Humam, a suspect apprehended related to the stabbing of Dr Afrasheem, confessed to the murder. Humam was convicted, and sentenced to death. His execution would be the first for over sixty years in the Maldives if it is carried out. Amnesty International reports that it has serious concerns about the trial and conviction.

References

Members of the People's Majlis
People from Malé
2012 deaths
Progressive Party of Maldives politicians
Maldivian murder victims
People murdered in the Maldives
Deaths by stabbing in the Maldives
Year of birth missing